Curruca is a genus of Sylviid warblers, best represented in Europe, Africa, and Asia. All of these species were formerly placed in the genus Sylvia.

Taxonomy
The genus Curruca was introduced by the German naturalist Johann Matthäus Bechstein in 1802. The type species (by tautonomy) is the lesser whitethroat Curruca curruca. The name Curruca is the Latin word for an unidentified small bird mentioned by the Roman poet Juvenal. The genus was split from Sylvia in the Howard and Moore Checklist in 2014 after a molecular phylogenetic study published in 2011. The split is now recognised by most modern authorities.

Species
The genus contains 27 species:
 Barred warbler, Curruca nisoria
 Layard's warbler, Curruca layardi
 Banded parisoma, Curruca boehmi
 Chestnut-vented warbler, Curruca subcoerulea
 Desert whitethroat, Curruca minula
 Lesser whitethroat, Curruca curruca
 Hume's whitethroat, Curruca althaea
 Brown parisoma, Curruca lugens
 Yemen warbler, Curruca buryi
 Arabian warbler, Curruca leucomelaena
 Western Orphean warbler, Curruca hortensis
 Eastern Orphean warbler, Curruca crassirostris
 African desert warbler, Curruca deserti
 Asian desert warbler, Curruca nana
 Tristram's warbler, Curruca deserticola
 Menetries's warbler, Curruca mystacea
 Rüppell's warbler, Curruca ruppeli
 Cyprus warbler, Curruca melanothorax
 Sardinian warbler, Curruca melanocephala
 Western subalpine warbler, Curruca iberiae
 Moltoni's warbler, Curruca subalpina
 Eastern subalpine warbler, Curruca cantillans
 Common whitethroat, Curruca communis
 Spectacled warbler, Curruca conspicillata
 Marmora's warbler, Curruca sarda
 Dartford warbler, Curruca undata
 Balearic warbler, Curruca balearica

References

Curruca
Bird genera
Taxa named by Johann Matthäus Bechstein